Old Towne, Orange Historic District, also known as Downtown Orange, and colloquially The Circle is a one square-mile district around Plaza Park in Orange, California, and contains many of the original structures built in the period after the city's incorporation.  It is a vibrant commercial district, containing Orange County's oldest operating bank.  The Historic District was listed on the National Register of Historic Places in 1997, and is the largest National Register District in California. The Old Towne Preservation Association is a non-profit organization dedicated to maintaining the district.

According to State Historic Resource Surveys, Orange is unique among the region and the state in that it has the second largest concentration of historic buildings. A list of all of the buildings and sites in Orange that appear in the National Register of Historic Places can be found at National Register of Historic Places listings in Orange County, California.

Orange International Street Fair
The district is home to the Orange International Street Fair, which has been held annually every Labor Day weekend since 1973. The inaugural event was held to celebrate the city's centennial and pay homage to the original 1910 Orange Street Fair. The Fair's success led to the city holding the event annually ever since. The event covers the Plaza, West and East Chapman Avenue, and North and South Glassell Street, and features international food and drink, live music and entertainment, and showcases for local businesses and non-profit organizations. The event typically draws several hundred thousand attendees over the course of the weekend.

Architectural styles in Old Towne Orange
Bungalow (see also California Bungalow—Bungalow)
Craftsman Bungalow
Craftsman (see also American Craftsman)
Hip Roof Cottage (see also Hip roof)
Mediterranean (see also Mediterranean Revival Style architecture)
Prairie (see also Prairie Style architecture)
Spanish Colonial (see also Spanish Colonial Revival Style architecture)
Victorian (see also Victorian architecture)

References

Orange, California
Orange, California
Orange, California
Orange, California
Orange, California
Orange, California
Neighborhoods in Orange, California
Historic districts on the National Register of Historic Places in California
National Register of Historic Places in Orange County, California